Kang Doo (born February 27, 1979) is a South Korean singer and actor. He is a former member of the group, The Jadu. He played the bass guitar and did backup vocals. Kang Doo is now replaced with a new member, Maru. He gave up his position for achieving his goal to become actor.

Acting career
Kang Doo starred in the third season of MBC's popular sitcom Hello Franceska. He also acted in MBC's Goong S as Lee Joon, however the series were not successful. In Goong S, he did not receive many positive comments from the viewers. This was his first time to act in major broadcasting program. Later, he revealed that it was quite hard to bear in mind the criticisms.

References

Living people
South Korean male television actors
South Korean pop singers
1979 births
21st-century South Korean  male singers